Johar Baru is a district of Central Jakarta, Indonesia. It is roughly bounded by Kampung Rawa Selatan Raya road and Mardani Raya road to the east, Percetakan Negara Raya Road to the south, Letjend Suprapto Road to the north, and a railway line to the west.

History
This was formerly part of Cempaka Putih which formed a neat south-eastern corner rectangle to the city centre. Thus at first, the latter was seven Administrative Villages: Cempaka Putih Timur, Cempaka Putih Barat, Galur, Tanah Tinggi, Kampung Rawa, Johor Baru, and Rawasari. In 1993, those of Galur, Tanah Tinggi, Kampung Rawa, and Johar Baru became Rahabayan Johar Baru.

Kelurahan (Administrative Village)
The district of Johar Baru is divided into four administrative villages (kelurahan):
Galur - area code 10530
Tanah Tinggi - area code 10540
Kampung Rawa - area code 10550
Johar Baru - area code 10560

List of important places
Kawasan Departemen Kesehatan (Health Department Complex)

References 

Districts of Jakarta
Central Jakarta